Coney Island Baby is a 2003 comedy-drama in which film producer Amy Hobby made her directorial debut. Karl Geary wrote the film and Tanya Ryno was the film's producer. The music was composed by Ryan Shore. The film was shot in Sligo, Ireland, which is known locally as "Coney Island".

The film was screened at the Newport International Film Festival. Hobby won the Jury Award for "Best First Time Director".

The film made its premiere television broadcast on the Sundance Channel.

Plot 
After spending time in New York City, Billy Hayes returns to his hometown. He wants to get back together with his ex-girlfriend and take her back to America in hopes of opening up a gas station. But everything isn't going Billy's way - the townspeople aren't happy to see him, and his ex-girlfriend is engaged and pregnant. Then, Billy runs into his old friends who are planning a scam.

Cast 
Karl Geary - Billy Hayes
Laura Fraser - Bridget
Hugh O'Conor - Satchmo
Andy Nyman - Franko
Patrick Fitzgerald - The Duke
Tom Hickey - Mr. Hayes
Conor McDermottroe - Gerry
David McEvoy - Joe
Thor McVeigh - Magician
Sinead Dolan - Julia

Music 
The film's original score was composed by Ryan Shore.

External links 

MSN - Movies: Coney Island Baby

2003 comedy-drama films
2003 directorial debut films
2003 films
2003 independent films
American comedy-drama films
American independent films
County Sligo in fiction
Films scored by Ryan Shore
Films set in Brooklyn
2000s American films